La Grande Plée Bleue is a peat bog located in Lévis in the administrative region of Chaudière-Appalaches, in Quebec, in Canada.

Geography 
This wetland is made up of a network of more than 650 ponds. Located north of the plée de Beauharnois and northeast of plée de Saint-Charles, it is the main source of the Couture River.

Ecology 
There are 150 plant species including carnivorous plants which are rare in Quebec. This ecological niches is home to 80 species of birds, including several species of waterfowl.

Toponymy 
The plée form is possibly a phonetic variant of the feminine term prée, in the sense of prairie. Indeed, the hesitation between r and l which dates back to the 16th and 17th centuries is widely attested in documents from New France. The blue color probably alludes to the presence of blueberry fields.

See also 
 Ecological reserves of Quebec

Notes and references

External links 
 Report from Radio-Canada

Protected areas of Chaudière-Appalaches
Bogs of Canada